Michael Joseph Lynch (June 28, 1880 – April 2, 1927) was a pitcher in Major League Baseball from 1904 to 1907. He pitched for the Pittsburgh Pirates and the New York Giants. He attended Brown University.

References

1880 births
1927 deaths
Baseball players from Massachusetts
Brown Bears baseball players
Major League Baseball pitchers
New Britain Rangers players
New London Whalers players
New York Giants (NL) players
Pittsburgh Pirates players